Beach volleyball at the 2018 Commonwealth Games was held on the Gold Coast, Australia from 6 to 12 April. The beach volleyball competition was held at Coolangatta Beachfront. This was the first time that Beach Volleyball was held at the Commonwealth Games. A total of twelve men's and twelve women's teams are scheduled to compete (48 athletes, at 2 per team) in each respective tournament.

Competition schedule
The following is the competition schedule for the Beach Volleyball competitions:

Medal table

Medalists

Qualification
A total of 12 men's teams and women's team qualified to compete at the games.

Men

Women

Participating nations
There are 16 participating nations in beach volleyball with a total of 48 athletes.

References

External links
 Results Book – Beach volleyball

 
Beach volleyball at the Commonwealth Games
2018 Commonwealth Games events
Commonwealth Games
International volleyball competitions hosted by Australia